Matthew Hamilton (born 2 February 1990 in Hemel Hempstead) is a British auto racing driver. He is best known for competing in the British Touring Car Championship.

Racing career
Hamilton raced in karting between 1999 and 2005. In 2005 he won a Formula BMW scholarship, which gave him entry to the 2006 Formula BMW UK season. He raced in Formula Palmer Audi in 2007. He won the opening race of the season at Silverstone, and was on pole position for the second. A fast-changing red starting light left Hamilton stranded on the startline. He was hit by several unsighted drivers and was spun around; it was then hit broadside at full racing speed by a car from the back of the grid. Hamilton was extracted from the cockpit and airlifted to hospital in Coventry with a broken right femur. In 2008 he competed in FPA and in the British Formula Ford Championship. In 2009 he made his GT racing debut at Silverstone racing in the FIA GT4 European Cup in a Ginetta G50.

He competed in the final two rounds of the 2009 British Touring Car Championship in a TH Motorsport-prepared Honda Civic, and continued in the same car for 2010. At the season's first meeting at Thruxton he collected funds for Help For Heroes. He was forced to miss the Croft round of the championship due to budgetary issues.
Hamilton signed for THM Racing in March 2014 the Watford-based Volkswagen Racing Cup outfit, to compete in the Volkswagen Racing Cup series backed by the giant Volkswagen Group.

Racing record

Complete GT4 European Cup results
(key) (Races in bold indicate pole position) (Races in italics indicate fastest lap)

Complete British Touring Car Championship results
(key) (Races in bold indicate pole position – 1 point awarded in first race) (Races in italics indicate fastest lap – 1 point awarded all races) (* signifies that driver lead race for at least one lap – 1 point awarded all races)

References

External links
Official Website

Living people
English racing drivers
1990 births
British Touring Car Championship drivers
Formula Palmer Audi drivers
Formula Ford drivers
Formula BMW UK drivers
Sportspeople from Hemel Hempstead
Motaworld Racing drivers
GT4 European Series drivers